High diving is the act of diving into water from relatively great heights. High diving can be performed as an adventure sport (as with cliff diving), as a performance stunt (as with many records attempts), or competitively during sporting events.

It debuted at a FINA event at the 2013 World Aquatics Championships in Barcelona, after the sport was added to the federation's list of disciplines. In the world championships, men jump from a  platform while women jump from a  platform. The sport is unique in that athletes are often unable to practice in an authentic environment until the days leading up to a competition.

History 

Initially, diving as a sport began by jumping from "great heights". Then it was exclusively practiced by gymnasts as they found it exciting with a low probability of injury. It then evolved into "diving in the air" with water as the safety landing base. Efforts by Thomas Ralph to name the sport "springing" were not realized, as the term "diving" was by then firmly rooted. It soon became a sporting event pursued by many enthusiasts. In the early years of the sport, finding suitable places to jump was an issue, and people started jumping from any high place – in Europe and the United States they started jumping from bridges, then diving head first into the water. This evolved into "fancy diving" in Europe, and, particularly in Germany and Sweden, as a gymnastic act. The sport further improved with gymnastic acts being performed during the diving process, and was then given the names "springboard diving" and "high fancy diving", which were events in the Olympics of 1908 and 1912.

Cliff diving has been documented as far back as 1770 when Kahekili II, king of Maui, engaged in a practice called "lele kawa", which in English means jumping feet first into water from great heights without making a splash. The king's warriors were forced to participate to prove that they were courageous and loyal to the king. The practice later developed into a competition under king Kamehameha I, and divers were judged on their style and amount of splash upon entering the water.

The first female world champion in this sport was Cesilie Carlton of the United States, who won the first gold medal at the 2013 World Aquatics Championships with a total score of 211.60. The first male world champion was Orlando Duque of Colombia who received a score of 590.20.

Overview

Pool diving 
Until 2018, the only permanent regulation-size high diving platform in the world is located in Austria, but it is not used during the winter period. In 2018, Zhaoqing Yingxiong High Diving Training Center, which contains the first year-round regulation-size high diving platform, opened at the Zhaoqing Sports Center in Zhaoqing, China. The training practice is generally done on  platforms. The "competition dives" are collectively put in place in pieces, similar to the way a dress is made. Dives such as five somersault dives can thrill, but some competitors prefer to perform simpler dives.

Outdoor diving 
Some outdoor diving involves launching from significant heights. One such diver noted, "There is adrenaline, excitement, danger – so many different energies go through your mind when you jump off. That goes away and then you hit the water come up and it's a massive elation, you feel such self achievement." A rescue team of scuba divers may be involved in some instances, and are required for any official competitions.

Cliff diving 

Cliff divers practice the different components of their dives in isolation and only execute the complete dive during championship competitions. Cliff dives are considered extremely difficult and dangerous, a challenge to every competitor; in addition to the physical challenges, they can be mentally challenging to perform.

Events 
The Red Bull Cliff Diving World Series is held annually and draws crowds of up to 70,000 people. Participants dive from a variety of locations including castles, cliffs, towers, bridges, and the Copenhagen Opera House. Gary Hunt of the United Kingdom won the August 2015 FINA world championships. The average age of the participants in this event was 30. Efforts were being made by divers to make this sport an Olympic event for the 2024 Summer Olympics to be held in Paris, France. However, the highest platform at the 2024 Summer Olympics will be the usual .

World record high dives 
There is considerable debate surrounding record claims for the highest dive, which largely revolves around criteria for what constitutes a valid dive. ABC's Wide World of Sports produced world record high dives for its Emmy award-winning sports anthology show for more than a decade. They required contestants to dive or execute at least one somersault and exit the water without the assistance of others. In 1983 Wide World of Sports produced its last World Record High Dive at Sea World in San Diego.

In 1987, Olivier Favre attempted a double back somersault from  but broke his back upon impact and had to be rescued. Laso Schaller's 2015 jump from a  cliff in Switzerland may not be considered a dive based on ABC's criteria (one somersault needed); however, he is the current record holder for Highest dive from a diving board according to the Guinness Book of Records, simultaneously holding the Highest Cliff Jump record for the same jump.

Men

Women

Health implications 
Some research suggests that the impact associated with high diving could have negative effects on the joints and muscles of athletes. To avoid injury to their arms upon impact with the water, divers from significant heights may enter the water feet first.

Pop culture 
The 2018 film Bumblebee featured a main character who was a former competitive high diver.

In 2022, YouTube group The Try Guys tested out high diving in Mission Viejo, California.

Image gallery

See also 

2014 FINA High Diving World Cup
La Quebrada Cliff Divers
List of World Aquatics Championships medalists in high diving
Red Bull Cliff Diving World Series – annual international series of cliff diving events that was established in 2009

Olympic events 
Diving at the 1912 Summer Olympics – Men's plain high diving
Diving at the 1912 Summer Olympics – Women's plain high diving
Diving at the 1920 Summer Olympics – Men's plain high diving
Diving at the 1924 Summer Olympics – Men's plain high diving

References

Further reading 

 – Contains content about high diving platforms

External links 

Official website for the FINA High Diving World Cup
Official website for the World High Diving Federation

 
Diving (sport)
Aquatics